AB Motala Verkstad is one of the oldest engineering companies in Sweden. The company was founded in 1822 during the construction of Göta Canal. Motala Verkstad has also built about 400 ships, 800 bridges (e.g. Västerbron, Skeppsholmsbron, Bergsnäsbron and the Ahvaz Bridge in Iran), railway equipment, 1300 locomotives. The 118-meter-tall towers of Uppsala Cathedral were also built by Motala Verkstad. During the 1970s the company was the world's largest exporter of kitchen sinks and during the 1980s they built landing gear for Swedish-built aircraft. As of 2023 the company employs about 240 people.

History 
Motala Verkstad was started in 1822 on Baltzar von Platen's initiative. Von Platen realized the importance of having local technical knowledge during the construction of the channel. The first leader was Daniel Fraser.

Ships built at Motala Verkstad
 Hildur-class monitors (1870s)
 M/S Juno (1874)
 SS Nya Svartsjölandet (1900, now MV Västan)
 SS Angantyr (1909)
 SS Valkyrian (1909, now SS Drottningholm)

In literature 
In the science fiction novel Twenty Thousand Leagues Under the Sea by Jules Verne, the spur of the submarine Nautilus is said to have been built at Motala Verkstad.

References and notes

External links 
 Motala Verkstad

Engineering companies of Sweden
Motala
Swedish companies established in 1822
Manufacturing companies established in 1822
Companies based in Östergötland County